Garurha is a village in West Champaran district in the Indian state of Bihar.

Demographics
As of 2011 India census, Garurha had a population of 837 in 145 households. Males constitute 50.65% of the population and females 49.34%. Garurha has an average literacy rate of 38.35%, lower than the national average of 74%: male literacy is 65.42%, and female literacy is 34.57%. In Garurha, 22.7% of the population is under 6 years of age.

References

Villages in West Champaran district